This article contains information about the literary events and publications of 1799.

Events

Premières of the second and third parts of Friedrich Schiller's dramatic trilogy Wallenstein are performed at the Weimarer Hoftheater under Johann Wolfgang von Goethe:
January 30 – Die Piccolomini.
April 20 – Wallensteins Tod (Wallenstein's Death) as Wallenstein.
April 13 – The father of Charles and Mary Lamb dies; Charles becomes his sister's guardian.
May 8 – The Religious Tract Society is established as an evangelical publisher in Paternoster Row, London; it continues as The Lutterworth Press into the 21st century.
December 20 – William Wordsworth and his sister Dorothy first take up residence at Dove Cottage, Grasmere. William completes the first version of The Prelude during the year.
unknown dates
A new edition of Edward Young's Night Thoughts is illustrated by Thomas Stothard.
The Monthly Magazine and American Review starts publication in the United States, edited by Charles Brockden Brown.

New books

Fiction
Anonymous – Village Orphan
Charles Brockden Brown
Arthur Mervyn
Edgar Huntly
Ormond
Thomas Campbell – The Pleasures of Hope
Elizabeth Gunning – The Gipsey Countess
Mary Hays – The Victim of Prejudice
Friedrich Hölderlin – Hyperion, vol. 2
William Henry Ireland – The Abbess
Jane West – A Tale of the Times
Mary Julia Young – The East Indian

Children
François Guillaume Ducray-Duminil – Les Cinquante Francs de Jeannette (Jeanette's Fifty Francs)
Edward Augustus Kendall
The Crested Wren. A Tale
The Canary Bird. A moral fiction interspersed with poetry
Dorothy Kilner (as M. Pelham) – Rational Brutes, or Talking Animals

Drama
 Thomas John Dibdin – Five Thousand a Year
 William Dunlap – The Italian Father
Joseph George Holman – The Votary of Wealth
 Elizabeth Inchbald – The Wise Man of the East 
Kamesuke – Picture Book of the Taiko (kabuki)
 Matthew Lewis – The East Indian
Friedrich von Schiller – Wallensteins Tod
Richard Brinsley Sheridan – Pizarro
Oscar Wegelin – The Natural Daughter
Thomas Sedgwick Whalley – The Castle of Montval

Poetry

Non-fiction
Hannah Adams – A Summary History of New-England
Hannah More – Strictures on the Modern System of Female Education
Lady Charlotte Murray – The British Garden
Philip Yorke – The Royal Tribes of Wales

Births
February 4 – Thomas Kibble Hervey, Scottish-born poet and critic (died 1859)
March – Dorothea Tieck, German translator (died 1841)
March 12 – Mary Howitt, English writer, poet and translator (died 1888)
March 13 – Maria Dorothea Dunckel, Swedish poet, translator and dramatist (died 1878)
March 20 – Karl August Nicander, Swedish poet (died 1839) 
April 17 – Eliza Acton, English poet and cookery writer (died 1859)
 May 13 – Catherine Gore, English author (died 1861)
May 20 – Honoré de Balzac, French novelist (died 1850)
May 23 – Thomas Hood, English poet (died 1845)
May 26 – Aleksandr Pushkin, Russian dramatist and poet (died 1837)
October 9 – Louisa Stuart Costello Irish writer on travel and history (died 1870)
November 29 – Amos Bronson Alcott, American writer, philosopher, and reformer (died 1888)
December 30 – John Moultrie, English poet and hymnist (died 1874)

Deaths
February 19 – Jean-Charles de Borda, French engineer and memoirist (born 1733)
February 24 – Georg Christoph Lichtenberg, German satirist (born 1742)
April 24 – William Seward, English man of letters (born 1747)
May 18 – Pierre Beaumarchais, French dramatist (born 1732)
August 30 – Eleonora Fonseca Pimentel, Italian poet and revolutionary (executed, born 1751)
December 31 – Jean-François Marmontel, French historian, writer (born 1723)

References

 
Years of the 18th century in literature